Parkes Shire is a local government area in the Central West region of New South Wales, Australia.  The Shire is located adjacent to the Broken Hill railway line and the Newell Highway.

The Shire includes the towns of Peak Hill, Alectown, Bogan Gate, Trundle and Tullamore.

The Mayor of Parkes Shire Council is Cr. Ken Keith, who is unaligned with any political party.

Heritage listings
Parkes has a number of heritage-listed sites, including:
 39 Currajong Street: Parkes Post Office
 May Street: Parkes railway station

Council

Current composition and election method
Parkes Shire Council is composed of ten councillors elected proportionally as a single ward. All councillors are elected for a fixed four-year term of office. The mayor is elected by the councillors at the first meeting of the council. The most recent election was held on 10 September 2016, and the makeup of the council is as follows:

The current Council, elected in 2016, in order of election, is:

References

External links

 
Local government areas of New South Wales
Newell Highway